Bjørn Aage Ibsen (August 30, 1915 – August 7, 2007) was a Danish anesthetist and founder of intensive-care medicine.

Education
Ibsen graduated in 1940 from medical school at the University of Copenhagen and trained in anesthesiology from 1949 to 1950 at the Massachusetts General Hospital, Boston.

Career
Ibsen became involved in the 1952 poliomyelitis outbreak in Denmark, where 2,722 patients developed the illness in a 6-month period with 316 suffering respiratory or airway paralysis. Treatment had involved the use of the few negative pressure ventilators available, but these devices, while helpful, were limited and did not protect against aspiration of secretions. After detecting high levels of CO2 in blood samples and inside a little boy's lung, Ibsen changed management directly. He instituted protracted positive pressure ventilation by means of intubation into the trachea, and enlisting 200 medical students to manually pump oxygen and air into the patients lungs. In this fashion, mortality declined from 90% to around 25%. Patients were managed in three special 35 bed areas, which aided charting and other management.

In 1953, Ibsen set up the world's first medical/surgical ICU in a converted student nurse classroom in Kommunehospitalet (The Municipal Hospital) in Copenhagen, and provided one of the first accounts of the management of tetanus with muscle relaxants and controlled ventilation. In 1954, Ibsen was elected head of the department of anaesthesiology at that institution. He jointly authored the first known account of ICU management principles in Nordisk Medicin, September 18, 1958: 'Arbejdet på en Anæsthesiologisk Observationsafdeling' ("The Work in an Anaesthesiologic Observation Unit") with Tone Dahl Kvittingen from Norway.

References

External links
 Medical Museion University of Copenhagen
 Louise Reisner-Sénélar (2009), The Danish anaesthesiologist Björn Ibsen a pioneer of long-term ventilation on the upper airways
 Der dänische Anästhesist Björn Ibsen – ein Pionier der Langzeitbeatmung über die oberen Luftwege, Louise Reisner-Sénélar, 2009

Danish intensivists
2007 deaths
1915 births
Danish anesthesiologists
Danish medical researchers
University of Copenhagen
20th-century Danish physicians